is a Japanese footballer who plays as a striker for J2 League club Tokushima Vortis, on loan from Kashiwa Reysol.

Career statistics

Club
.

References

2000 births
Living people
Association football people from Chiba Prefecture
University of Tsukuba alumni
Japanese footballers
Association football forwards
Kashiwa Reysol players
Tokushima Vortis players